The St. Patrick Mission Church in Denver, Colorado, known also as St. Patrick's, is a historic church at 3325 Pecos Street.  It was built in 1907 and was added to the National Register of Historic Places in 1979.

The parish was established in 1881.

References

External links

Roman Catholic churches in Denver
Mission Revival architecture in Colorado
National Register of Historic Places in Denver
Churches on the National Register of Historic Places in Colorado
Roman Catholic churches completed in 1907
1881 establishments in Colorado
Religious organizations established in 1881
20th-century Roman Catholic church buildings in the United States